Michael Ralph Scaccia (June 14, 1965 – December 22, 2012) was an American musician, best known as a guitarist for several heavy metal and alternative rock acts, including Rigor Mortis, Ministry and Revolting Cocks.

Life and career
Scaccia was born in Babylon, New York. He was of Italian descent and had three older sisters.

Scaccia's first band, Spectrum, was formed with high school friends Chuck and Chad Williams on guitar and bass, Johnny Carpenter on drums and Barry (Baron) Lane on vocals. Bruce Corbitt eventually replaced Barry Lane on vocals. Scaccia left Spectrum in late June 1982; the next year, he formed Rigor Mortis with schoolmates Harden Harrison and Casey Orr. Bruce Corbitt was added to the lineup on vocals in the summer of 1986. Within five years they landed a major label deal with Capitol Records in 1987. In 1988, Rigor Mortis released their self-titled debut album via the label.

In 1989, Scaccia was asked by Al Jourgensen to join his band Ministry for their 1989–1990 The Mind is a Terrible Thing to Taste tour. Jourgensen was so impressed by Scaccia's talents that he included him into the band full-time. Scaccia left Rigor Mortis in 1991. He then went on to record and tour for Ministry's next album, Psalm 69, throughout 1992. He also played on their Lollapalooza tour.

Throughout 1994–1995, recording began on Ministry's follow-up to Psalm 69..., Filth Pig. They relocated to Austin, Texas where sessions took place. Amidst the recording, on August 29, 1995, Scaccia was arrested at a Wal-Mart for heroin possession. He was originally confronted because he resembled an armed-robbery suspect and he was carrying a case that they thought might contain a gun. When they opened the case, they found heroin instead. Scaccia was arrested and then released on $2,500 bail. He left the band right after completing Filth Pig, in attempt to rid off his addiction.

In 2003, Rigor Mortis, with Scaccia in the lineup, reformed in Texas to positive reviews. Also at this time, a clean, sober Jourgensen again asked him to rejoin for touring their new album, Animositisomina. He agreed, but left Ministry again in 2006 before rejoining with Al Jourgensen in the studio to record what would be Relapse, which was scheduled to tour in the summer of 2012. It was confirmed that Scaccia had been working with the original members of Rigor Mortis as they worked on their first album in 20 years.

Scaccia collapsed onstage shortly after 11:30 pm on December 22, 2012 at The Rail Club in Fort Worth, Texas, where he was performing as part of the 50th birthday celebrations for Bruce Corbitt, the singer for Rigor Mortis; he died onstage between 11:36 pm and 11:40 pm. He was officially pronounced dead at a local hospital shortly after midnight on December 23. Although initial reports suggested a seizure possibly caused by the strobe lighting at the venue, the coroner indicated the cause of death to be a sudden heart attack brought on by heart disease. He was 47. A memorial service was held for Scaccia on Sunday, December 30 at the Aristide Event and Conference Center in Mansfield, Texas.

Personal discography

With Rigor Mortis
 Rigor Mortis (1988)
With Ministry
 In Case You Didn't Feel Like Showing Up (1990)
 Psalm 69: The Way to Succeed and the Way to Suck Eggs (1992)
 Filth Pig (1996)
 Greatest Fits (2001)
 Houses of the Molé (2004)
 Rio Grande Blood (2006)
 Cover Up (2008)
 Relapse (2012)
 From Beer to Eternity (2013)
With Revolting Cocks
 Linger Ficken' Good...And Other Barnyard Oddities (1993)
 Cocked and Loaded (2006)

With Lard
 Pure Chewing Satisfaction (1997)
 70's Rock Must Die (2000)
With 1000 Homo DJs
 Supernaut (1990)
With Skrew
 Burning in Water, Drowning in Flame (1992)
With League of Blind Women
 League of Blind Women (1998)
With Buck Satan and the 666 Shooters
 Bikers Welcome Ladies Drink Free (2011)
Various artists compilation
 Lucio Fulci: A Symphony of Fear (1999)

References

Bibliography

External links

1965 births
2012 deaths
20th-century American guitarists
21st-century American guitarists
American heavy metal guitarists
American industrial musicians
American people of Italian descent
Guitarists from New York (state)
Industrial metal musicians
Lard (band) members
Ministry (band) members
Musicians who died on stage
People from Babylon, New York
Revolting Cocks members